Grand Forks is a ghost town and former community at the confluence of Bonanza Creek and Eldorado Creek in Yukon. First settled about 1896, it became the second-largest settlement in the Klondike. With approximately 10,000 people lived in or by Grand Forks during the Klondike Gold Rush, it was the only community besides Dawson City to have a municipal government. The Grand Forks Hotel was a roadhouse here during the gold rush.

See also
 List of ghost towns in Yukon

References

Ghost towns in Yukon